Grover Cleveland Hall, Sr. (January 11, 1888 – 1941) was an American newspaper editor. At the Montgomery Advertiser in Montgomery, Alabama, he garnered national attention and won a Pulitzer Prize during the 1920s for his editorials that criticized the Ku Klux Klan.

Newspaper career

Hall was born in Haleburg, Alabama, near the Georgia and Florida borders, and educated in the state's country schools. Grover was ten in 1898, when his older brother William Theodore Hall started newspaper work in Dothan, Alabama, also in the southeastern corner of the state. W.T. Hall was editor of the Dothan Eagle from 1905 to 1924 (his death) and Grover started work under him in 1905. There he was a printer's devil; from 1907 to 1910 he worked in editorial positions at the Enterprise Ledger (Enterprise, AL), Dothan Daily Siftings, Selma Times, and at the Pensacola Journal, where he wrote editorials in 1910. That year he moved to be associate editor of the Montgomery Advertiser in the state capital, where he married in 1912, became chief editor in 1926, and was appointed probate judge in 1933.

Today the Montgomery Advertiser says that it "waged war on the resurgent Ku Klux Klan" during the 1920s. Hall won the annual Pulitzer Prize for Editorial Writing in 1928 for that work. The official citation specified "his editorials against gangsterism, floggings and racial and religious intolerance." Hall had previously supported the Ku Klux Klan until it challenged the state's dominant political establishment, the Big Mule/Black Belt coalition, in the election of 1926.

Hall endorsed Al Smith for U.S. President in 1928 (against Hoover). He was a friend of H.L. Mencken, editor of The Baltimore Sun, and they exchanged many letters, some of which "inspired Hall to think critically about the South". Mencken did not support democracy but theirs was "a remarkable coincidence of views" on less political matters, according to the Hall family biographer (quoted in the review).

Late in the 1930s, Hall argued for release of the black Scottsboro Boys who were commonly defended only in the North.

The Egregious Gentile

On December 4, 1938, the Advertiser published Hall's editorial "The Egregious Gentile Called to Account". It carried the subtitle: "Clinical notes on his lack of gallantry and sportsmanship, his bad mental habits, his tactlessness, his lack of imagination, his poor discernment, his faults as citizen and neighbor, his gullibility and arrogance." Hall observed that "1,000,001 articles and books" have defended the Jew. "Fortunately he does not stand in need of defense. But I can think of 100 reasons why his Gentile brother, usually ignored by critics, invites and deserves arraignment before the bar of his own conscience. ... The earth swarms with men who think they are experts on the Jew. Nobody attempts a critical estimate of the Gentile as a Gentile. ... I, for one, marvel at this escape of the Gentile from accountability and justice." He concluded that in order to save "the lovely pillars of civilization we shall have to purge ourselves. That striding Colossus known as the Nordic Gentile must be born again."

"The Egregious Gentile" was published in the U.S. Congressional Record on January 17, 1939. It was issued by the New York City League for Industrial Democracy as pages 27–40 of a 40-page pamphlet, with a longer article by the editor of The New Republic.
 "The Jewish refugee problem", by Bruce Bliven, and "The egregious Gentile called to account", by Grover C. Hall (New York: League for Industrial Democracy, copyright 1939)
The pamphlet opened with a two-page dedication to the recently deceased Baruch Charney Vladeck and was sold for 15 cents.

Family

Hall married Claudia English in 1912 and they had one son. His wife suffered an emotional breakdown in 1929 and Hall died of a bleeding ulcer in 1941 (from a scholarly review of the family biography, An Alabama Newspaper Tradition).

Grover Cleveland Hall, Jr. (February 10, 1915 – September 24, 1971) was educated in the Montgomery public schools and worked seven years in  Advertiser reporting and writing positions before World War II military service. In the United States Army Air Corps from 1942 to 1945, he contributed some articles to the Advertiser and Alabama Journal from England. He was a Montgomery Advertiser editor after the war, and editor-in-chief from 1956 to 1971. Or from 1948 until fired in 1966.  He also authored the book "1000 Destroyed" about the 4th Fighter Group of the US Army Air Corps.   Hall allied with George C. Wallace in 1958 and was preparing to be director of publications for the Wallace organization when he died in 1971. After the 16th Street Baptist Church bombing of 1963, Hall wrote that Wallace had no need to apologize for the violence he had encouraged by his call for resistance to court-ordered desegregation. Instead, he wrote, it was President John Kennedy who "inflamed the Negroes during the recent trouble by rehearsing their historic grievances. He may also have inflamed him who finally planted the dynamite at the church."

See also

References

External links
  (one belongs to his father Grover C. Hall)
 
Library of Congress and WorldCat records nominally for the son (1915–1971) actually pertain to both Grover C. Halls and the family.

1888 births
1941 deaths
People from Henry County, Alabama
American newspaper editors
Pulitzer Prize for Editorial Writing winners
Writers from Montgomery, Alabama
Date of death missing
Place of death missing
Journalists from Alabama